Diplomatic relations between the Republic of Serbia and the Republic of San Marino were established by the exchange of Notes on 14 February 2002 (ratified by Grand and General Council on 30 July 2002).

San Marino has an embassy in Belgrade while Serbia covers San Marino from an embassy in Rome. The Ambassador of San Marino to Serbia is Ubaldo Livolsi. The Ambassador of Serbia to Italy accredited on non-residential basis to San Marino is Sanda Rašković Ivić. Ambassador Livolsi presented his Letters of Credence on 2 February 2005.

History 
Yugoslavia and the Republic of San Marino signed the Agreement on the establishment of consular relations by an exchange of Notes of 25 September and 13 October 1961, respectively. According to the Agreement, a senior diplomat in the Embassy of the SFR Yugoslavia in Rome was designated as Consul-General to the Republic of San Marino.

The Captains Regent paid a visit to Yugoslavia in 1984. San Marino's Foreign Minister Fabio Berardi visited Belgrade on 15 July 2005 where he met with Serbian President Boris Tadić, Prime Minister Vojislav Koštunica and Foreign Minister Vuk Drašković. During the visit, Berardi promised that San Marino will support all Serbia's requests in the Council of Europe, during its chairmanship, regarding urge for the affirmation of dialogue and territorial sovereignty of Serbia. In 2008, after the Republic of Kosovo declared its independence, San Marino Foreign Ministry stated that San Marino recognises the right to self-determination but that it also believes that "the Helsinki Final Act plays an important part of the precious equilibrium". The statement pointed at the problem of ethnic hatred in the area of former Yugoslavia. San Marino did not wish to rekindle ethnic and religious conflicts by recognizing Kosovo as an independent state, although it believed that all the people of Kosovo need to be supported by international solidarity. San Marino supports the continued presence of the Organization for Security and Co-operation in Europe (OSCE) on Kosovo and would wait with the decision on recognition until the status of Kosovo is resolved through dialogue of both sides under the supervision of United Nations, so that both sides can count on international impartiality of judgement. Despite this, San Marino recognized the independence of the Republic of Kosovo on 11 May 2008.

See also
Foreign relations of San Marino
Foreign relations of Serbia

References

External links
Titano e Serbia-Montenegro sempre più vicine La Tribuna Sammarinese
 Delegazione all'Assemblea Parlamentare dell’OSCE: "la Repubblica di San Marino ritiene quanto mai opportuna la presenza della missione OSCE in Kosovo auspicandone un suo potenziamento, e propone l’avvio immediato di un tavolo di discussione politica", San Marino Web

Bilateral relations of Serbia
Serbia